Charles James Edward Smith (25 December 1872 – 27 March 1947) was a South African cricketer who played in three Tests in 1902.

Smith was a right-handed middle-order batsman who played a few first-class matches for Transvaal between 1894 and 1904. He made his highest first-class score in the final of the Currie Cup in 1896–97, when he scored 70 against Western Province. When the Australians toured South Africa in 1902 he made 58 and 71 not out for a Transvaal XV and was selected for the three Tests. His best score in the three Tests was 45 in the second innings of the Third Test, when he and Bill Shalders added 79 for the second wicket after South Africa followed on 167 runs behind.

References

External links
 

1872 births
1947 deaths
South Africa Test cricketers
South African cricketers
Gauteng cricketers